There are dozens of streams or places named Ward Creek, 69 of which are in the United States, according to the USGS GNIS.
 Ward Creek (Alameda County), California
 Ward Creek (Lake Tahoe)
 Ward Creek (Rogue River tributary), a stream in Oregon